Carolingian is an adjective applied to topics concerning or in the time of the Carolingian dynasty in medieval history. Secondarily it can mean developments only in the time of Charlemagne. Carolingian has been applied to:

 Carolingian Empire, founded by Charlemagne.
 Carolingian Renaissance, a cultural revival in Europe
 Carolingian art, a type of art
 Carolingian architecture, a type of architecture
 Carolingian minuscule, a type of writing
 Carolingian schools, a type of school

See also
 Carolinian (disambiguation)
 Charlemagne (disambiguation)